is a Japanese bobsledder who has competed since 1997. He finished 27th in the two-man event at the 2006 Winter Olympics in Turin.

References
 
 
 

1978 births
Bobsledders at the 2006 Winter Olympics
Japanese male bobsledders
Living people
Olympic bobsledders of Japan
21st-century Japanese people